A total of 15 CONCACAF teams entered the competition. The 15 teams were divided into 3 zones, based on geographical considerations, as follows:
 North American Zone had 3 teams. The teams played against each other on a home-and-away basis. The group winner and runner-up would advance to the Final Round.
 Central American Zone had 5 teams. The teams played against each other on a home-and-away basis. The group winner and runner-up would advance to the Final Round.
 Caribbean Zone had 7 teams, which would be divided into 2 groups - Group A had 4 teams and Group B had 3 teams. 2 teams in Group A played in the preliminary round, against each other on a home-and-away basis, with the winner advancing to Group A proper. The 3 teams in each group would then play against each other on a home-and-away basis. The group winners would advance to the Final Round.

North American Zone

 

 

 

 

 

Canada and Mexico advanced to the finals.

Central American Zone

 

 

 

 

 

 

 

 

 

 

 

 

 

 

 

 

 

 

 

Honduras and El Salvador advanced to the  finals.

Caribbean Zone

Group A Preliminary Round

Guyana won 8-4 on aggregate and advanced to Group A.

Group A

 

 

 

 

 

Cuba advanced to the  finals.

Group B

 

 

 

 

 

Haiti advanced to the  finals.

Goalscorers

5 goals

 Jorge González
 Salvador Bernárdez

4 goals

 Clyde Watson
 Roberto Bailey
 Hugo Sánchez

3 goals

 Julio Roberto Gómez Rendón
 José Emilio Mitrovich
 José Roberto Figueroa

2 goals

 Omar Morera Barrantes
 Luis Hernández
 Roberto Pereira
 Norberto Huezo
 José María Rivas
 Selvin Pennant
 Ashton Canterbury Taylor
 Serge Crispin
 Adrián Camacho
 Daniel Montillo Ruíz
 Johan Leisbergen
 Steve Moyers

1 goal

 Gerry Gray
 Robert Iarusci
 Branko Šegota
 Mike Stojanović
 Omar Arroyo
 Javier Jiménez
 William Jiménez Mora
 Rodolfo Mills
 Regino Delgado
 Roberto Espinosa
 Andrés Roldán
 Óscar Gustavo Guerrero
 Carlton Belfon
 Douglas Cherubin
 Jude Julien
 Jude Mitchell
 Óscar Enrique Sánchez
 Allan Wellmann
 Gordon Braithwaite
 Clyde Ford
 Fritz Bobo
 Carlo Brevin
 Fernando Bulnes
 Allan Anthony Costly
 Moisés Tomás Velásquez Torres
 José Luis González China
 Guillermo Mendizabal
 Glenn Kwidama
 Ricardo Paschal Chambers
 Ricardo Calor
 Roy George
 Kenneth Stjeward
 Leroy Spann
 Rick Davis
 Greg Villa

References

CONCACAF Gold Cup qualification
qualification
qualification